Slow Machine is an 2020 American thriller film, directed by Joe DeNardo and Paul Felten, from a screenplay by Felten. It stars Stephanie Hayes, Chloë Sevigny, Scott Shepherd, Eleanor Friedberger, Ean Sheeny and Emily Tremaine.

Slow Machine had its world premiere at the International Film Festival Rotterdam on January 23, 2020, and was theatrically released on June 4, 2021, by Grasshopper Film.

Cast
 Stephanie Hayes as Stephanie
 Chloë Sevigny as Chloe
 Scott Shepherd as Gerard
 Eleanor Friedberger as Eleanor
 Ean Sheeny as Jim
 Emily Tremaine as The Relator

Release
The film had its world premiere at the International Film Festival Rotterdam on January 23, 2020. The film also screened at the New York Film Festival on October 8, 2020. In October 2020, Grasshopper Film acquired distribution rights to the film and theatrically released Slow Machine on June 4, 2021.

References

External links
 

2020 films
2020 thriller films
American thriller films
Films produced by Shrihari Sathe
2020s English-language films
2020s American films